The Citroën C3 (codenamed CC21) is a crossover-inspired supermini/subcompact hatchback (B-segment) produced by Citroën. Differing from the European C3, the vehicle was announced on 16 September 2021 as a vehicle dedicated for the Indian and South American markets. Avoiding the "crossover SUV" branding, the model has been described by Citroën as a "modern hatchback".

It is built on the CMP modular platform originally developed by Groupe PSA, with body length under  to occupy a lower tax bracket in India. It has been sold in India since mid-2022. In 2022, the Indian version has 90% local parts.

Overview
Production in Brazil started in March 2022. The C3 was launched in the country late August of the same year with 1.0 and 1.6 engines. It is priced between A-segment (such as Renault Kwid) and B-segment (such as Hyundai HB20) vehicles.

The Brazilian C3 was launched in Argentina late October 2022. In Argentina and in Uruguay, the 1.0 FireFly Fiat engine is replaced by the 1.2 PureTech PSA engine. The base model is the most affordable vehicle in Argentina at its launch. 

From 2023, the Brazilian C3 is exported outside of Mercosur, in several Latin America countries such as Chile and Peru.

Sales

References

External links 

 Official website (India)

C3 (C21)
Cars introduced in 2021
Cars of Brazil
Subcompact cars
Hatchbacks
Front-wheel-drive vehicles